Acacia beauverdiana, commonly known as pukkati, is a member of genus Acacia  that is native to Western Australia. It has yellow flowers and it blooms from July to October. It is native to Western Australia.

Aboriginal uses 
The Noongar people of southwest Western Australia burned the top small branches of pukkati and mixed the ash with equal parts of Pituri (Duboisia hopwoodii) to relieve intense pains such as toothache.

References

External links 

 Acacia beauverdiana Photo -- Florabase 

beauverdiana
Trees of Australia
Fabales of Australia
Acacias of Western Australia